Mirage is a ghost town in Rawlins County, Kansas, United States.

History
Mirage was issued a post office in 1885. The post office was discontinued in 1895.

References

Further reading

External links
 Rawlins County maps: Current, Historic, KDOT

Former populated places in Rawlins County, Kansas
Former populated places in Kansas
1885 establishments in Kansas
Populated places established in 1885